American Boyfriends is a 1989 Canadian comedy-drama film written and directed by Sandy Wilson and starring Margaret Langrick, John Wildman, Jason Blicker, Liisa Repo-Martell, and Delia Breit. It is the sequel to My American Cousin (1985). Langrick and Wildman reprise their roles as Sandy Wilcox and Butch Walker respectively.

The soundtrack for this film contains songs by a number of popular Canadian music groups of the era including Barney Bentall and the Legendary Hearts, Colin James, Sass Jordan, Spirit of the West, and BTO.  The soundtrack was released on CD by Penta Records.

Awards
The film was nominated for "Best Original Song" ("Restless Dreamer" by Barney Bentall and the Legendary Hearts) and "Best Sound Editing" (as was the first film) at the 11th Genie Awards.

The single "Wooly Bully" (BTO) reached #80 on the Canadian charts.

"Back in My Arms Again" (Colin James) also reached #80 on the Canadian charts.

References

External links

1989 films
English-language Canadian films
1980s English-language films
1989 comedy-drama films
Films set in 1965
Films set in Vancouver
Canadian comedy-drama films
Films directed by Sandy Wilson
1980s Canadian films